The Thetford Assurancia (previously Thetford Mines Isothermic) is a professional ice hockey team based in Thetford Mines, Quebec. The team is part of the Ligue Nord-Américaine de Hockey (LNAH). The team plays at the Centre Mario Gosselin.

History
Previously this LNAH franchise was known as the Thetford Mines Coyotes (1996–2000), and as the Thetford Mines Prolab (2000–07). In 2007, team was renamed again as Thetford Mines Isothermic after its sponsors, Portes & Fenêtres Isothermic, a local seller of doors, windows and furnishings. The team got a new sponsor in 2015 and was renamed Thetford Assurancia. It is the last remaining original franchise of the LNAH in its original city.

Notable players
 Mathieu Biron, former Florida Panthers and New York Islanders defenseman
 Philippe DeRouville, former Pittsburgh Penguins draft pick.
 Christian Proulx, former Montreal Canadiens draft pick.
 Link Gaetz, former NHL enforcer
 Jeremy Stevenson, former Mighty Ducks of Anaheim and Minnesota Wild forward
 Patrice Tardif, former Los Angeles Kings and St. Louis Blues forward
 Yves Racine, former Detroit Red Wings defenseman
 Michel Picard, former Hartford Whalers forward
 Daniel Poudrier, former Quebec Nordiques defenseman
 Marquis Mathieu, former Boston Bruins forward
 Gaetan Royer, former Tampa Bay Lightning forward
 Eric Lavigne, former Los Angeles Kings defenseman
 Olivier Michaud, former Montreal Canadiens goalie
 Daniel Goneau, former New York Rangers forward

External links
 Thetford Assurancia official site

Ice hockey teams in Quebec
Ligue Nord-Américaine de Hockey teams
Sport in Thetford Mines